The 1992 Tasmanian state election was held on 1 February 1992 in the Australian state of Tasmania to elect 35 members of the Tasmanian House of Assembly. The election used the Hare-Clark proportional representation system — seven members were elected from each of five electorates. The quota required for election was 12.5% in each division.

The incumbent Labor Party minority government, headed by Michael Field hoped to secure a majority and second term.  The Labor Party was headed by Michael Field. The Green independents were led by Bob Brown. The Liberal Party was led by Ray Groom.

Prior to the election the Labor Party was in minority government, supported by five Green independents in a loose alliance referred to as the Labor-Green Accord. The Labor Party held 13 seats and the Greens 5 out of 35 a combined majority of 18. The Liberal Party held 17 of the 35 seats.

The Labor minority government had spent much of their term focusing on economic reform. The priority of the Field government was reducing state debt, which had the support of the Greens. Government cuts in spending, were able to help Tasmania  reach its debt servicing commitments, but were a source of discontent in the community. The minority government succeeded until late 1991 when lobbying from the forestry industry caused Field to introduce legislation to protect the industry from conservation. The legislation had the support of the Liberal Party and passed both houses easily. However, the Greens withdrew their support of the government, prompting Labor to an election for February 1992.

The Liberal Party needed to win only one seat at this election to be returned into majority, and needed a primary vote swing of about 4.5 percent to gain that seat.  Labor needed five seats to win an outright majority.

Minor parties contesting this election included Advance Tasmania; which ran candidates in each electorate. A political party called "More Jobs" fielded candidates in Denison.

Results

The result saw a swing against the Labor Party and the Greens in the direction of the Liberal Party. The 7.19 percent swing to the Liberals—almost double what they needed to win government—assured Groom would have a secure majority in the next state parliament.

Although the Greens suffered a 3.90% swing against them, their primary vote of 13.23% statewide was above the required quota for election, and it was only in Bass and Braddon that they depended on a large flow of preferences to hold their seats.

The Labor Party polled poorly with a net loss of two members. The party lost four members; Michael Weldon in Braddon, former Premier Harry Holgate and Jim Cox in Bass, David Crean in Denison. The party gained two members; Gill James in Bass and Julian Amos in Denison. The fall in the Labor vote could be attributed to the instability of the Labor-Green accord, but also because of government spending cuts.

Minor parties and Independents collectively had an increase in votes, but were far from reaching the required quota for election.

This is the first successive election to date in which Tasmanian voters were presented with a different Premier from the previous election.

Primary vote by division

Distribution of seats

See also
Candidates of the 1992 Tasmanian state election
Members of the Tasmanian House of Assembly, 1992–1996

References

Parliament of Tasmania election results

Elections in Tasmania
1992 elections in Australia
1990s in Tasmania
February 1992 events in Australia